Belamoty is a town and commune in southwest Madagascar. It belongs to the district of Betioky Sud, which is a part of Atsimo-Andrefana Region. The population of the commune was estimated to be approximately 19,000 in 2001 commune census.

Primary and junior level secondary education are available in town. The majority 80% of the population of the commune are farmers, while an additional 10% receives their livelihood from raising livestock. The most important crops are rice and cassava, while other important agricultural products are beans and tomato.  Services provide employment for 8% of the population. Additionally fishing employs 2% of the population.

Geography
Belamoty is situated at the Onilahy River.

References and notes 

Populated places in Atsimo-Andrefana